Gërdec is a village in Albania, 11 kilometers north-west of the capital Tirana. It is part of the municipality Vorë. It was the site of the explosions at a military base on 15 March 2008, causing the deaths of 26 people and injuring over 100. The event was featured on the Discovery Channel series Destroyed In Seconds.

Defense Minister Fatmir Mediu resigned, and the press reported many irregularities at the blast site, operated by an Albanian company that deactivated the country's aging ammunition and then sold it for scrap.

References

Populated places in Vorë
Villages in Tirana County